The Blue Hour is the eighth studio album by English alternative rock band Suede. The album was released on 21 September 2018.

It was the first Suede album since A New Morning not to be produced by longtime producer Ed Buller, and the first to be produced by Alan Moulder. This is their final album to be released under Warner Music.

Background
The concept for The Blue Hour began in May 2016, when lead singer Brett Anderson, guitarist Richard Oakes and keyboardist Neil Codling wrote the song "Mistress"; a song about a boy's realisation of his father's affair. The band then spent eighteen months composing the rest before recording it in six weeks from September to October 2017 at Assault & Battery studios in London with new producer Alan Moulder. The band finished the recording of the album in February 2018, shortly after the recording of orchestra sessions was finished, later finished the mixing in April, announcing the album, release date, tracklisting and artwork at the end of that month along with their testing press of the album at Abbey Road Studios.

Release and promotion
The album was announced on 28 April 2018 with the mysterious title, #Suede8 through their Instagram, before they revealed the official title on 30 April 2018 via a video trailer on their Instagram and YouTube, along with their 2018 UK and Europe Tour.

Just over a week before its release, the band uploaded their final trailer with the backsong "Flytipping" through their social media and YouTube.

The first promotional single, "The Invisibles", was released on 3 June 2018. Second single, "Don't Be Afraid If Nobody Loves You" followed on 12 July. The third, "Life Is Golden" was released on 15 August; its accompanying music video comprises footage of Ukrainian ghost town, Pripyat. Fourth single, "Flytipping" was issued on 14 September. The accompanying music video of "Wastelands" was uploaded on 29 October through their official YouTube channel, and featured the free-runner Robbie Griffith.

The album was released in a number of different versions:
Standard physical & digital release – contains the album tracks.
Deluxe Box Set – contains the album tracks on CD and LP, along with a CD of instrumental tracks, a 7" vinyl with the bonus track "Manipulation", a DVD with commentary from the band and Alan Moulder and the entirety of the album's artwork.

The Official Charts Company reported midweek sales of 9,654. It had sold 10,986 units by the end of the week.

Reception

The Blue Hour was released to positive reviews from critics. At Metacritic, which assigns a normalised rating out of 100 to reviews from mainstream critics, The Blue Hour has an average score of 77 based on 16 reviews, indicating "generally favorable reviews."

Commercial performance
The Blue Hour charted at number five on the UK Albums Chart, which is the highest-charting album by the band since Head Music in 1999. The album has sold 27,396 units as of July 2021 according to the Official Charts Company.

Year-end lists

Track listing

Personnel

Suede
 Brett Anderson – vocals
 Richard Oakes – guitar
 Simon Gilbert – drums
 Mat Osman – bass guitar
 Neil Codling – synthesiser, piano

Technical
 Alan Moulder – production, mixing
 Neil Codling – additional production
 Caesar Edmunds – engineering
 Richie Kennedy – engineering assistance 
 Tom Herbert – engineering assistance 
 Geoff Pesche – mastering

Orchestra
 City of Prague Philharmonic Orchestra
 Guy Protheroe – conducting
 Lucie Švehlová – concertmaster
 Neil Codling – arrangement 
 Richard Oakes – arrangement 
 Oli Langford – arrangement 
 Craig Armstrong – arrangement 
 Vitek Kral – recording engineering
 Michael Hradiský – assistant engineering

Charts

References

External links
 

2018 albums
Suede (band) albums
Albums produced by Alan Moulder
Warner Music Group albums